= Ahmed El Esseily =

Egyptian director

Ahmad El Esseily
- Born: 1976 (age 49–50)
- Citizenship: Egyptian
- Occupations: Writer, radio presenter, TV presenter, film editor
- Writing career
- Language: Arabic
- Genres: Politics, daily life, personal philosophy

Ahmad El Esseily (Arabic: أحمد العسيلي), born 1976, is an Egyptian film and television editor/director, and host of radio and television shows. He graduated from the German Department of the Faculty of Alsun (Linguistics) in 1997.

From 1999 to 2004 Esseily was a professional film editor, assistant director and director, working mainly on television commercials, music videos, documentaries, short films and Satellite programs for Egyptian and Arabian channels.

== Biography ==
- FMTV Season I (TV & Radio Show) 2004–2005 Mazzika TV & Nogoom FM
- FMTV Season II (TV & Radio Show) 2005–2006 Mazzika TV & Nogoom FM
- "Thursday at eight" (الخميس الساعة تمانية)(On-air Radio Show) 2006 Nogoom FM
- (حبة عسيلي)(a bit of Esseily) (TV Show) Season I 2007–2008 Otv
- (حبة عسيلي)(a bit of Esseily) (TV Show) Season II 2008 Otv
- "Esseily on the radio" (عسيلي على الراديو) daily 5 min. during the morning show 2008 Nogoom FM
- "Esseily on the radio in Ramadan" (عسيلي على الراديو في رمضان) Season I, II, III, IV 2007 / 2008 / 2009 / 2010 Nogoom FM
- Esseily also writes a monthly article in "Us"(إحنا) magazine published by Core Publications since 2006
- His first book "A book without a name" (كتاب مالوش إسم) was published in August 2009.
- His second book titled "The second book" (الكتاب التاني) also published by "Dar el Shorouk" ) (دار الشروق) on 1 January. 2011.
